Mythimna denticula, or Mythimna (Mythimna) denticula, is a moth of the family Noctuidae first described by George Hampson in 1893. It is found in Sri Lanka.

References

External links
Molecular Phylogeny of Indonesian Armyworm Mythimna Guenée (Lepidoptera: Noctuidae: Hadeninae) Based on CO I Gene Sequences

Moths of Asia
Moths described in 1893
Hadeninae

Mythimnini